Young Woman at a Fountain is an 1824 oil on canvas painting by Fleury François Richard, now in the Museum of Fine Arts of Lyon. He painted it from one of his studies of monuments on Île Barbe. It shows a young woman filling a vessel at a fountain whose basin is an ancient Roman sarcophagus reused in the construction of the abbey on the island in 400.

Sources
Sylvie Ramond (dir.), Gérard Bruyère et Léna Widerkher, Le Temps de la peinture : Lyon, 1800-1914, Lyon, Fage éditions, 2007, 335 p., ill. en coul.

Paintings in the collection of the Museum of Fine Arts of Lyon
1824 paintings
Paintings by Fleury François Richard